Oba Fatai Ayinla Aileru (born 11 March 1938)  The Great Monarch, is the current Oba (king) of Mushinland and the Chairman of Obas and Chiefs of Mushin Local Government. He is a First Class Oba (King) which qualifies him to be a Permanent Member of Council of Obas in Lagos State, Nigeria. Lagos State  Council of Obas and Chiefs is one body, which has the capacity to contribute phenomenally to good governance in the State by constantly availing government of its wisdom and sound advice: using its tremendous influence to mobilize popular support for public policy as well as being an important source of communication and feedback between the government and the grassroots. The Institution of the Council of Obas and Chiefs is a critical building block that every government must engage seriously if development and orderly  societal growth is at the core of its vision.

As an Institution, the Council of Obas and Chiefs is as old as Lagos state itself. It was established following the creation of Lagos State through the Council of Obas and Chiefs of Lagos State, Edict 1969 which came into force in April, 1969. The erstwhile Council of Obas and Chiefs, which was constituted in December 1995 with Thirty-One members, was dissolved by the immediate past State executive Council at its 11th meeting held on Monday 28 May 2007. The new Council has a total of Fifty-one members drawn from  the five divisions of the State namely Lagos Island, Ikeja, Epe, Ikorodu and Badagry.

Life
He was the first-born child of Oba (King) Jimoh Gbadamosi Aileru and Olori (Queen) Elizabeth Alake, born on 11 March 1938. Having started his primary school career at the Christian Public School, Mushin, he proceeded to the Metropolitan College, Surulere, for his secondary school education. On completion, Fatai Ayinla Aileru joined Pan African Metals (NIG) limited, Ikorodu Road, Yaba where he worked as a cashier. As a result of his interest in public service, Fatai Ayinla Aileru joined the Mushin District Council, created in 1955, which later became Mushin Local Government in 1964. In 1977, while still with the Council, he was called upon to take the place of his forefathers as the next in line to the Throne of Mushinland. Oba Fatai Ayinla Aileru II (Justice of Peace) has travelled far and wide. He is a philanthropist as well as a sport lover whose major objective is attaining the best for his people. This effort of his resulted to the renaming of a market street to Oba Fatai Ayinla Aileru street by the Chairman of Mushin Local Government: Sir Olu Aina in 1989.

References

External links
Allafrica.com

1938 births
Living people
Nigerian royalty
People from Lagos
Residents of Lagos